Curena is a genus of snout moths. It was described by Francis Walker in 1866.

Species
 Curena caustopa
 Curena costipunctata Shibuya, 1928
 Curena externalis Walker, [1866] 1865

References

Pyralini
Pyralidae genera